Namasia is a genus of moths belonging to the family Tortricidae.

Species
Namasia catoptrica Diakonoff, 1983

See also
List of Tortricidae genera

References

External links
tortricidae.com

Eucosmini
Tortricidae genera